Romans 9 is the ninth chapter of the Epistle to the Romans in the New Testament of the Christian Bible. It is authored by Paul the Apostle, while he was in Corinth in the mid-50s AD, with the help of an amanuensis (secretary), Tertius, who adds his own greeting in Romans 16:22.

Reformer Martin Luther stated, "in chapters 9, 10, and 11, St. Paul teaches us about the eternal providence of God. It is the original source which determines who would believe and who would not, who can be set free from sin, and who cannot".

Methodist writer Joseph Benson summarises this chapter:

Text
The original text was written in Koine Greek. This chapter is divided into 33 verses.

Textual witnesses

Some early manuscripts containing the text of this chapter are:
Papyrus 40 (~250; extant verses 16–17, 27)
Papyrus 27 (3rd century; extant verses 3, 5–9) 
Codex Vaticanus (325–350)
Codex Sinaiticus (330–360)
Codex Alexandrinus (400–440)
Codex Ephraemi Rescriptus (~450; complete)

Old Testament references
 Romans 9:7 references Genesis 21:12
 Romans 9:9 references Genesis 18:10,14
 Romans 9:12 references Genesis 25:23
 Romans 9:13 references Malachi 1:2,3
 Romans 9:15 references Exodus 33:19
 Romans 9:17 references Exodus 9:16
 Romans 9:25 references Hosea 2:23
 Romans 9:26 references Hosea 1:10
 Romans 9:27 references Isaiah 10:22,23
 Romans 9:29 references Isaiah 1:9
 Romans 9:33 references Isaiah 8:14 and Isaiah 28:16

Paul's lament over Israel (9:1–5)
The remarks in verses 1–5 seem to mirror Exodus 32:30–34, when Moses offered to be "blotted out of the book" for the Israelites, who had "sinned a great sin" for worshiping the golden calf at the Mount Sinai. This incident may also underline Paul's description of human idolatry and rebellion in Romans 1:18–32 and Paul explicitly contrasted his ministry with that of Moses in 2 Corinthians 3:4–11. Therefore, Paul speaks of the 'Israelites' (verse 4 and more generally in chapters 9–11) instead of the 'Jews'.

Verse 3

Alexander Kirkpatrick, in the Cambridge Bible for Schools and Colleges, associates Paul's willingness to be "cursed and cut off from Christ" for the sake of his brethren with Moses' prayer for the forgiveness of his wayward people ("forgive their sin – but if not, I pray, blot me out of Your book which You have written")  and with King David's mourning on the death of his son Absalom, "O my son Absalom – my son, my son Absalom – if only I had died in your place! O Absalom my son, my son!".

God's consistency evident in the election of true Israel (9:6–29)

Verse 6

The divine promises to Abraham were fulfilled, even though "only a portion of Abraham's natural descendants" were elected.

Verse 7

Verse 7 cites Genesis 21:12.

The failure of Ishmael and Esau to obtain their natural birthright does not hinder the fulfillment of God's promises, because it is through the second born, Isaac and Jacob, the true "children of promise", that God's plan was fulfilled.

Verse 13

Verse 13 cites Malachi 1:2–3.

Verse 27

Verse 27 citea Isaiah 10:22–23.

Verse 28

Verse 28 cites Isaiah 10:22–23.

Israel's failure explained (9:30–33)
In the passage that continues until Romans 10:21, Paul gives statements on Israel's response and responsibility regarding the proclamation of Christ. After providing a view "from above" in verses 6–29, that is, from the perspective of God's purpose and election of Israel, the subsequent verses provide a view "from below", that is, from the perspective of the Jews, "who had worked diligently to be righteous, have rejected faith in Christ, the only thing able to make them truly righteous", whereas some Gentiles effortlessly believe in Christ.

Verse 33

Verse 33 cites Isaiah 8:14 and Isaiah 28:16; cross reference 1 Peter 2:6,8.

See also

 Abraham
 Esau
 Hosea
 Isaac
 Israel
 Isaiah
 Jacob
 Moses
 Pharaoh
 Rebecca
 Sarah
 Zion

 Related Bible parts: Genesis 18, Genesis 21, Genesis 25, Exodus 9, Exodus 33, Isaiah 1, Isaiah 8, Isaiah 10, Isaiah 28, Hosea 1, Hosea 2, Malachi 1

References

Bibliography

External links
 King James Bible - Wikisource
English Translation with Parallel Latin Vulgate
Online Bible at GospelHall.org (ESV, KJV, Darby, American Standard Version, Bible in Basic English)
Multiple bible versions at Bible Gateway (NKJV, NIV, NRSV etc.)
On Romans 9:5

 
09